Sycophaga is a mainly Afrotropical gall wasp genus of the superfamily Chalcidoidea that live on the section Sycomorus of the monoecious fig subgenus, Sycomorus, and one of several fig wasp genera to exploit its mutualism with Ceratosolen wasps.

They enter the fig during the receptive phase of development, and oviposit inside the short-style flowers. This induces the growth of endosperm tissue and the enlargement and ripening of the syconium which holds the wasp-bearing drupelets, without pollination taking place.

The genus can be characterized by having a long ovipositor, non-metallic coloration, a square mesoscutellum, and a long propodeum.

Species
The described species include:
 Sycophaga afflicta Grandi, 1916
 Sycophaga callani Grandi, 1955
 Sycophaga cyclostigma Waterston, 1916
 Sycophaga depressa Risbec, 1956
 Sycophaga gigantea Grandi, 1916
 Sycophaga gigas Mayr, 1906
 Sycophaga insularis Grandi, 1916
 Sycophaga silvestrii Grandi, 1916
 Sycophaga sycomori Linnaeus, 1758
 Sycophaga tenebrosa Grandi, 1917
 Sycophaga valentinae Grandi, 1952
 Sycophaga vicina Mayr, 1906
 Sycophaga viduata Grandi, 1916

References

External links 

Hymenoptera genera
Agaonidae